The 2006 Luch-Energiya Vladivostok season was the club's 2nd season in the Russian Premier League, and their first since 1993. Luch-Energiya Vladivostok finished the season in 7th, reached the Round of 16 in the 2005–06 Russian Cup, and in the 2006–07 Russian Cup they were knocked out at the Round of 32 stage by Dynamo Makhachkala.

Squad

On loan

Left club during season

Transfers

In

Loans in

Out

Loans out

Released

Competitions

Premier League

Results by round

Results

League table

Russian Cup

2005-06

2006-07

Squad statistics

Appearances and goals

|-
|colspan="14"|Players away from the club on loan:
|-
|colspan="14"|Players who appeared for Luch-Energiya Vladivostok but left during the season:

|}

Goal scorers

Clean sheets

Disciplinary record

Notes

References

FC Luch Vladivostok seasons
Luch-Energiya Vladivostok